Daniel Johansson (born July 5, 1981) is a Swedish former professional ice hockey player. He was selected by the Los Angeles Kings in the 4th round (125th overall) of the 1999 NHL Entry Draft.

Between 2000 and 2009, Johansson played 260 regular season games, mostly with the Växjö Lakers, in the Swedish HockeyAllsvenskan. He retired following the 2011-12 season spent with Mariestad BoIS HC, a Swedish Division 1 team.

Personal information
His younger brother Nicklas Johansson (born June 13, 1984), plays hockey with IF Björklöven of HockeyAllsvenskan.

References

External links

1981 births
Living people
Sportspeople from Umeå
Swedish ice hockey forwards
Los Angeles Kings draft picks
Swedish ice hockey defencemen